The 1894 Hampden–Sydney football team represented Hampden–Sydney College during the 1894 college football season. In their only game of the 1894 season, Hampden–Sydney beat the then-unnicknamed William & Mary for their football program's first ever win.

Schedule

References

Hampden–Sydney
Hampden–Sydney Tigers football seasons
College football undefeated seasons
Hampden–Sydney Tigers football